Jennifer Ann Celotta (born November 11, 1971) is an American television producer, writer, and director. Among her credits are The Office, Cobra Kai, Abbott Elementary, Malcolm in the Middle, The Newsroom, Greg the Bunny, Andy Richter Controls the Universe and Home Improvement. She has directed three episodes of The Office: "Crime Aid", "The Promotion" and " Promos". By the fifth season, Celotta was serving as an Office Executive producer and one of the series show runners, along with fellow writer Paul Lieberstein. Celotta and Lieberstein wrote the fifth season finale "Company Picnic", which ended with character Pam Beesly learning she is pregnant.

Celotta and her co-writers on The Office received Emmy Award nominations for Outstanding Comedy Series in 2007, 2008, and 2009 but lost all three years to 30 Rock. The team also received Writers Guild of America Award nominations for Best Comedy Series each year since 2006. They won the award in 2007, but lost in 2006 to Curb Your Enthusiasm, and to 30 Rock in 2008 and 2009. Celotta and her The Office co-writers were also nominated for a WGA in 2006 for Best New Series, but lost to Grey's Anatomy.

After getting her start directing The Office, Celotta has directed episodes of Cobra Kai, People of Earth, and Trial & Error.

Celotta won a WGA Award in the category "Comedy/Variety – Music, Awards, Tributes – Specials" in 2009 for co-writing the 2008 Independent Spirit Awards ceremony. She shared the award with fellow co-writers Billy Kimball, Aaron Lee and The Office co-star Rainn Wilson.

Filmography

References

External links
 

1971 births
American television directors
American television producers
American women television producers
American television writers
American women television directors
Living people
People from Gaithersburg, Maryland
American women television writers
Writers Guild of America Award winners
Screenwriters from Maryland
21st-century American women